Dramatis are an English synth-pop band formed in the early 1980s. Chris Payne (vocals, keyboards), Rrussell Bell (guitars, keyboards), Cedric Sharpley (drums), and Denis Haines (keyboards) were all originally members of Gary Numan's backing band. They formed Dramatis following Numan's announced (but short-lived) retirement from touring in April 1981.

They released seven singles and one album before disbanding in 1982. Two of their singles reached the UK Singles Chart: the 1981 single with Numan "Love Needs No Disguise" which reached number 33, and the 1982 single "I Can See Her Now" which reached number 57.

In 2012 plans to reunite Dramatis were cancelled following the passing of Cedric Sharpley, who died from a heart attack on 13 March 2012.

In 2019 Rrussell Bell and Chris Payne announced a new Dramatis single called "The Torment of Angels", and that they were working on a second Dramatis album.

Discography

Studio albums

Singles

References

External links
 Cedric Sharpley obituary

English electronic music groups
English new wave musical groups
British synth-pop new wave groups
Musical groups established in 1981
Musical groups disestablished in 1982
Musical groups reestablished in 2013
Musical groups from London
Rocket Records artists